William Stanley Alston Brown, known as Stanley Brown (23 May 1877 – 12 September 1952) was an English cricketer who played for Gloucestershire as a right-handed batsman and left-arm slow bowler between 1896 and 1919. He made over 160 appearances in first-class cricket, scoring 4,820 runs and taking 195 wickets. He was born in Clifton and died in Kingsdown, both areas of Bristol.

References
Notes

Sources

1877 births
1952 deaths
Cricketers from Bristol
English cricketers
Gloucestershire cricketers
London County cricketers
Gentlemen cricketers
Gentlemen of the South cricketers